Omar Alejandro Cojolum Delgado (born 15 June 1990) is a Mexican professional gridiron football running back for the Dinos de Saltillo of the Liga de Fútbol Americano Profesional (LFA). Cojolum played college football at the Universidad del Valle de México (UVM). He started his professional career in 2016 with the Mayas CDMX, winning the 2016 and 2017 Tazón México. In 2020, after spending the offseason with the Hamilton Tiger-Cats of the Canadian Football League (CFL), Cojolum returned to Mexico and was signed by Dinos de Saltillo.

Early life
Cojolum was born on 15 June 1990 and was raised in Naucalpan, State of Mexico, close to Mexico City, by his mother. He has two brothers, one of them, his elder brother, "forced" him to play American football. Despite initially not wanting to practice American football, Cojolum played in local teams since he was four years old and joined the youth club Mavericks, where he won six championships. Cojolum has stated that the neighborhood where he grew up was dangerous and that many people there ended up on drugs or crime, but thanks to his love for sport he managed to stay out of trouble.

College career
Cojolum was offered a scholarship to play at the Universidad del Valle de México (UVM) joining the Linces UVM, where he played from 2010 to 2015. In 2013, Cojolum had surgery after suffering an injury in a match against Burros Blancos, missing the entire 2013 season.

Professional career

Mayas CDMX
After finishing his college eligibility with the Linces UVM, Cojolum was signed by the Mayas CDMX as the team's first pick of the inaugural LFA draft. He scored the first points in LFA history, doing so in the league's inaugural match, where the Mayas defeated the Raptors de Naucalpan 34–6.

Cojolum rapidly became one of the league's top players, helping the Mayas to win the Tazón México back to back in 2016 and 2017. He was awarded as the best running back of the 2017 LFA season.

Hamilton Tiger-Cats
Cojolum was selected by the Hamilton Tiger-Cats as the 14th pick of the second round of the 2019 CFL–LFA Draft. He joined the team in the offseason but did not make it to the final roster for the 2019 season.

Dinos de Saltillo
Cojolum was signed by the Dinos de Saltillo ahead of the 2020 LFA season, though it was ultimately cancelled due to the COVID-19 pandemic in Mexico.

In November 2022, Cojolum was re-signed by the Dinos ahead of the 2023 LFA season.

References

Living people
1990 births
Mexican players of American football
Mexican players of Canadian football
American football running backs
Canadian football running backs
Mayas CDMX players
Hamilton Tiger-Cats players
Dinos de Saltillo players
Linces UVM players
Sportspeople from the State of Mexico
People from Naucalpan